John Payne  was born on the  1st of February 1980 in Manly. He is an Australian-born Tongan former rugby union player. He played as a centre.

Career
Payne was first capped for the Tonga national team on 30 November 2002, during the match against Papua New Guinea's team in Port Moresby. He was also part of the 2003 Rugby World Cup Tonga squad, playing four matches and scoring a try in the tournament, with his last test cap being during the pool stage against the Canadian team in Wollongong on 29 October 2003. At club level, Payne played for Manly RUFC, Sale Sharks, Racing Metro 92 and Blagnac SCR.

References

External links

John Payne international statistics
John Payne Itsrugby.fr
John Payne European club statistics

1980 births
Living people
People from Manly, New South Wales
Tonga international rugby union players
Tongan rugby union players
Expatriate rugby union players in France
Expatriate rugby union players in England
Rugby union wings
Rugby union centres
Australian sportspeople of Tongan descent
Rugby union players from Sydney
Tongan expatriate rugby union players
Australian expatriate rugby union players
Australian rugby union players
Australian expatriate sportspeople in England
Australian expatriate sportspeople in France
Tongan expatriate sportspeople in England
Tongan expatriate sportspeople in France
Sale Sharks players
Racing 92 players